Adan or Adán is a surname. Notable people with the surname include:

Adán
 Antonio Adán, Spanish footballer
 José Carlos Adán, Spanish long-distance runner
 José Pérez Adán, Spanish communitarian sociologist
 Martín Adán, Peruvian poet
Adan
 Muhammad Shukor Adan, Malaysian footballer
 Avraham Adan, Israeli general

References 

Spanish-language surnames